The Auburn Public Library, also known as Old Auburn Library, is located at 175 Almond Street in Auburn, Placer County, California.

The Neoclassical style building was completed in 1909.

It was listed on the National Register of Historic Places on March 31, 2011.

See also
 National Register of Historic Places listings in Placer County, California

References

Auburn, California
Public libraries in California
Buildings and structures in Placer County, California
Library buildings completed in 1909
Libraries on the National Register of Historic Places in California
National Register of Historic Places in Placer County, California
1909 establishments in California
Neoclassical architecture in California